Hibbertia reticulata is a species of flowering plant in the family Dilleniaceae and is endemic to north Queensland. It is a shrub with spreading branches, egg-shaped leaves with the narrower end towards the base, and yellow flowers arranged singly in leaf axils, with 32 to 48 stamens arranged in two or three groups around the two densely hairy carpels.

Description
Flowering occurs from June to September.

Taxonomy
Hibbertia reticulata was first formally described in 2012 by Hellmut R. Toelken in the Journal of the Adelaide Botanic Gardens from specimens collected by Barry John Conn and Andrew N.L. Doust near Tozer Gap in 1993. The specific epithet (reticulata) refers to the leaf veins, especially of young leaves.

Distribution and habitat
This hibbertia mainly occurs on the Iron Range in northern Queensland, where it grows in open forest and woodland.

See also
List of Hibbertia species

References

reticulata
Flora of Queensland
Plants described in 2012
Taxa named by Hellmut R. Toelken